The 2020–21 Prva A Liga is the 15th season of the Montenegrin Basketball League, the top tier basketball league on Montenegro. No team from the last season was relegated, while KK Podgorica and KK Pljevlja were promoted.  In this season, 8 teams from Montenegro will participate in basketball international competitions which have been the most ever.

Competition format 
Twelve of the fourteen teams that play the league join the regular season and play a two-round robin competition where the six first qualified teams supposed to join the Super Liga with the two 2020–21 ABA League teams (Budućnost Voli and Mornar). The last three qualified teams will be relegated to the Prva B.

Super Liga was cancelled and playoff semifinal with first two teams from regular season along with Budućnost Voli and Mornar will determine the champion.

Teams

Regular season

League table

Notes

Playoffs
Semifinals was played in a best-of-three-games format, while the finals in a best-of-five one.

Montenegrin clubs in European competitions

References

External links 

 Montenegrin Basketball Federation official website

Prva A liga seasons
Montenegro
Prva A liga